Hipsters is an Australian TV documentary series, presented by Samuel Johnson and broadcast in 2015 on Special Broadcasting Service multichannel SBS 2.

The six-part series embarks on a global quest to understand the origins, meaning and future of the cultural stereotype that has become known as the hipster. It looks at how artisan cheese, craft beer, tattoos and beards evolve from being niche trends to hipster clichés. And asks why no hipster will ever, ever admit to being one.

Episodes
 Episode 1 What Is a Hipster?
 Episode 2 Fix Me a Snack
 Episode 3 Here Come the Hipsterpreneur
 Episode 4 The Future's Behind Us
 Episode 5 Tokyo Retro - Fomo
 Episode 6 The Next Big Thing

Awards and nominations

See also 
 Hipster
 Soul Mates

References

External links 
 

Special Broadcasting Service original programming
2010s Australian documentary television series
2015 Australian television series debuts
Hipster (contemporary subculture)